The International Motor Show Germany or International Mobility Show Germany, in German known as the Internationale Automobil-Ausstellung (IAA – International Automobile Exhibition), is one of the world's largest mobility shows. It consists of two separate fairs, that subdivided in 1991. While the IAA MOBILITY displays passenger vehicles, motorcycles and bikes, the IAA TRANSPORTATION specializes in commercial vehicles. Before the separation, the show was held solely at the Messe Frankfurt.

The IAA is organized by the Verband der Automobilindustrie (VDA – Association of the German Automotive Industry) and is scheduled by the Organisation Internationale des Constructeurs d'Automobiles (OICA), who recognize the IAA as one of the "big five" (most prestigious auto shows worldwide).

History

In 1897 the first IAA was held at the Hotel Bristol in Berlin, with a total of eight motor vehicles on display. As the automobile became more known and accepted, the IAA became a fixed event in Germany, with at least one held every year, usually in Berlin. From 1905–1907, there were two per year, as the production had increased to an industrial level. In the next years the show was suspended due to the ongoing World War I, and was then reinstated in 1921 with 67 automobile manufacturers displaying 90 vehicles under the motto "comfort".

Despite the still perceptible after-effects of the global recession, the 22nd IAA was held in Berlin in 1931, with a total of 295,000 visitors. For the first time the exhibition included front-wheel drive vehicles. In 1939, the 29th installation of the event gathered a total of 825,000 visitors – an all-time record at that time. The new Volkswagen was presented for the first time, which later came to be known as the Beetle. This was the last IAA before it was again suspended during World War II, after which Germany and Berlin was divided, with West-Berlin being isolated within Communist East Germany. From 1947–1949, West Germany's automobile and accessories manufacturers took part in the export trade fair in Hanover. The automobile industry's hall acted like a magnet on the public, with a great number of visitors coming to the show. In 1951 the show was held on the Messe Frankfurt for the first time. The event, which was held in April, attracted a total of 570,000 visitors, with exhibits including the first HGV to have a turbo diesel engine. Just six months later, in September 1951, a second exhibition in Berlin was held, gathering 290,000 visitors. From then on, the German automobile industry bade farewell to its traditional exhibition site in Berlin and relocated the motor show completely to Frankfurt. The IAA was also rescheduled to only take place every other year.

In 1989 the last IAA to feature both passenger cars and commercial vehicles in one show confirmed that the exhibition site in Frankfurt was now too small for this major event. Almost 2,000 exhibitors squeezed onto an exhibition site measuring 252,000 square metres. More than 1.2 million visitors attended the event. Because of the high demand, it was no longer possible to meet exhibitors' requirements for adequate exhibition stands. In view of this, the VDA decided to split the IAA from now on, with a focus on passenger vehicles in odd years, and a focus on commercial vehicles in even years. The first IAA focused solely on passenger cars, held in 1991, was a huge success. A total of 1,271 exhibitors from 43 countries displayed their new products and innovations. With more than 935,000 visitors, the IAA Passenger Cars was extremely well attended. In the following year the first IAA Commercial Vehicles took place in Hanover, Germany. It saw 1,284 exhibitors from 29 countries and gathered 287,000 people, 66 per cent being trade visitors.

In 2001 the September 11 attacks on the World Trade Center in New York cast a shadow over the IAA Cars in Frankfurt. The exhibition went ahead all the same. As a mark of solidarity with the victims and their dependants, all show elements and loud music as well as the official opening ceremony with the Federal Chancellor were cancelled. VDA President Gottschalk explained this decision: "Because we could not permit terrorist forces to take away our freedom of action. And because, as a key international sector, we have a responsibility not to allow things to grind to a halt." In an impressive manner, the general public confirmed that this indeed was the right decision to take: more than 800,000 people visited this "quiet IAA".

In spite of the Great Recession, the IAA Cars 2009 proved to be a magnet for visitors. Around 850,000 people visited the auto show in Frankfurt, which greatly exceeded the target of 750,000. The headline "A Moving Experience" showed, where the mobility of tomorrow is heading. A huge number of options were presented at the IAA, ranging from the mild hybrid and the plug-in hybrid to the all-electric car, fuel cells and hydrogen power.

Developments in the 2010s 

The 2010s were marked by the transformation of the automotive industry: 
In 2011 the 63rd IAA featured the all-new "Hall of Electric Mobility", a first-timer to all Motor Shows worldwide. Additional IAA-premieres included the Electric Mobility Conference as well as the CarIT Conference dealing with the issue of connected driving. This approach was repeated in 2013.

In 2015, the IAA introduced New Mobility World, a platform for the entire ecosystem of electric mobility, autonomous driving, connectivity and urban mobility. In the second week of the IAA, the emissions scandal (Dieselgate) became public. Until the IAA Cars 2015, exhibitor numbers were consistently above 1,000, and the number of visitors was 931,700.

The 67th IAA Cars 2017 – the first after the emissions scandal – was overshadowed by a loss of confidence in the German automotive industry. For the first time, the number of exhibitors fell below 1,000, while the number of visitors dropped to 810,000 – the worst figure since 2001. Meanwhile, New Mobility World grew significantly to 250 participating organizations, 200 conference speakers and 250,000 visitors. Since 2017, NMW's purpose was to not only to be Europe's leading innovation platform for future mobility, but also to develop and establish formats and business models beyond the booth rental of conventional auto shows.

This trend continued at the 58th IAA Cars 2019, with New Mobility World growing to over 400 participating organizations, doubling the number of attendees to 500,000, and increasing its international reach, with 62% of the 240 speakers and 47% attendees at the English-only conference coming from abroad. International media perceived New Mobility World to have "become the meeting point for the world's leading companies in automotive technologies and mobility" by now.

The IAA itself recorded only 560,000 visitors (including NMW), the number of exhibitors fell to 873, in particular due to a further loss of international exhibitors. It was also accompanied by much larger protests than in the past. According to the organizers, a total of 25,000 participants, 18,000 of them by bicycle, came to a demonstration on 14 September for a change in traffic policy; the police spoke of about 15,000.

The IAA Cars 2019 was the last IAA held in Frankfurt. In 2021, IAA adopted the New Mobility World concept, formats and business model, rebranded to IAA MOBILITY, and moved to Munich.

Change of venue location

2019 marked the final year that the IAA hosted its automotive exhibition in Frankfurt. In the several previous years, more and more manufacturers opted out of the IAA or greatly downsized their presence. The marques that specialise in high performance and luxury vehicles — such as Aston Martin, Bentley, Bugatti, Ferrari, and Rolls-Royce — were often the biggest draw at the IAA show, and they were absent from the several previous exhibitions. BMW had downsized its presence from 11,000 to 3,000 square metres. Since 2017, visitor numbers have almost halved, this, in addition to controversies such as Dieselgate and the global climate change issue, have prompted the IAA to change the scope of the exhibition and to pick a new venue.
The rapidly decreasing number of visitors in the last several exhibitions reflected the waning enthusiasm for the IAA, along with prominent protests against the car industry by environmental activists.

The contract between Messe Frankfurt and VDA, the IAA organiser, expired in 2019. VDA chose not to renew the contract, citing the above reasons. Instead, VDA indicated its intention of moving its biannual automotive exhibitions to another city for 2021 onward. The final three candidate cities were Berlin, Hamburg, and Munich. Four other cities had also submitted bids but didn't make the final round: Cologne, Frankfurt, Hanover, and Stuttgart.

On 3 March 2020, VDA chose Munich. Munich beat out Berlin and Hamburg based on three criteria. Munich Airport is the second Lufthansa hub and has many direct international flights (second to Frankfurt); Munich is home to BMW and several other high tech industries such as Apple, Google, and many start-up companies; the city has 130,000 employees working in automobile industry. The Greens-led city council and Bavarian state government have given their support, along with 2/3 of people who responded to the survey. The event was planned to take place from 7 to 12 September, before the start of Oktoberfest, but was cancelled due to Covid. The IAA MOBILITY finally took place in September 2021.

Major vehicle introductions

1951 
The following introductions were made at the 1951 show:
BMW 501
Automobiles Marathon prototype
Mercedes-Benz W187
Mercedes-Benz M186 engine

1955 
The following introductions were made at the 1955 show:
BMW 503
BMW 505 Prototype

1957 
The following introductions were made at the 1957 show:
DKW 600 (later called DKW Junior)
Goggomobil T600
NSU Prinz I

1959 
The following introductions were made at the 1959 show:
BMW 700
Borgward P100
Mercedes-Benz W111 Sedan
Porsche 356B T5

1961 
The following introductions were made at the 1961 show:
BMW 1500 Sedan
BMW 3200 CS
Glas 1004
NSU Prinz 4
Porsche 356B T6

1963 
The following introductions were made at the 1963 show:
Alfa Romeo Giulia Sprint GT
Glas 1700
Glas GT
NSU Prinz 1000
Porsche 356C
Porsche 901

1965 
The following introductions were made at the 1965 show:
Alfa Romeo 2600 De Luxe
Glas 1700 TS
Glas V8
Mercedes-Benz W108
NSU Typ 110
Opel Kadett B

1967 
 Dino Berlinetta Competizione concept

1969 
The following introductions were made at the 1969 show:
Audi 100 Coupé S
Opel Coupe Diplomat concept
Porsche 914

1973 
The following introductions were made at the 1973 show:

 BMW 2002 Turbo
Bitter CD

1977 
The following introductions were made at the 1977 show:
Ferrari 308 GTS
Ford Granada Mark II
Opel Rekord E

1979 
The 1979 Show occurred in a tough year for the automobile industry, with a focus on decreased speed limits and conserving energy, with most of Western Europe on the brink of a severe recession. It also occurred at a time when car design was changing substantially, with hatchbacks and front-wheel drive becoming increasingly popularity, as well as demand increasing for smaller "supermini" cars.

The following introductions were scheduled for the 1979 show:

Alfa Romeo 6
Audi 200
BMW 745i
Citroën GSA (a facelifted version of the 1970 Citroën GS, which featured a hatchback instead of its predecessor's saloon body style)
Fiat Ritmo Cabriolet
Ford Taunus TC3 (a facelifted version of the 1976 Taunus/Cortina, which was Britain's best selling car)
Lancia Delta (winner of the European Car of the Year award for 1980)
Mercedes-Benz W126 (S-class)
Mitsubishi Lancer EX (European premier)
Renault 5 five-door model (joining the three-door hatchback model which had been launched in 1972)
Talbot 1510
Volkswagen Jetta (saloon version of the Volkswagen Golf)
Volvo 345 (five-door hatchback version of the Volvo 343, launched in 1976)

1981 
The following introductions were made at the 1981 show:
Audi Auto 2000 concept
Bitter SC convertible
Ford Probe III concept
Mercedes-Benz Auto 2000 concept
Opel Ascona C
Opel Tech 1 concept
Porsche 944
Volkswagen Auto 2000 concept

1983

1983 was, in most of Western Europe, a year of recovery in the new car market, as the economy recovered from the recent recession. Many important new cars were launched at Frankfurt and elsewhere during 1983. Those launched elsewhere include the Austin Maestro, Fiat Uno, Nissan Micra, Peugeot 205 and Renault 11. The Opel Corsa (launched in Spain in September 1982) was also imported to the UK from April 1983, where it was sold as the Vauxhall Nova.

The following introductions were made at the 1983 show:
Alfa Romeo 33 1.5 4x4
BMW M635 CSi (high performance version of the 635 CSi, launched in 1976)
Fiat Regata
Ford Sierra XR4i (fuel-injected, high performance version of the Sierra hatchback, launched in 1982)
Mercedes-Benz 190E (new entry-level saloon in the Mercedes-Benz range)
Opel Junior concept
Renault Fuego Turbo (turbocharged version of the Fuego coupe, launched in 1980)
Volkswagen Golf Mk2
Zender Vision 1S concept (Audi Quattro based)

1985

The following introductions were made at the 1985 show:
BMW M3 (high performance version of the 3 Series two-door sports saloon)
Ferrari 328
Ferrari Mondial 3.2
Mercedes-Benz E Class estate
Zender Vision 2 concept
Porsche 959

1987

The following introductions were made at the 1987 show:
Alfa Romeo 164 (flagship Alfa Romeo saloon, and the last of four cars to be developed on the Type Four platform with Fiat, Lancia and Saab)
BMW Z1
Ferrari F40
Ford HFX Aerostar Ghia concept
Lamborghini Portofino concept

1988 
The following introductions were made at the 1988 show:
Porsche 964 Speedster

1989

The following introductions were made at the 1989 show:
Alfa Romeo SZ (high performance sporting coupe)
BMW 8 Series (E31) (luxury sporting coupe to replace the long-running 6 Series)
Fiat Uno (facelifted version of hugely successful supermini, in production since 1983)
Land Rover Discovery (mid-range 4X4 in the Land Rover section of the Rover Group)
Peugeot 605 (flagship saloon model in the Peugeot range)
Rolls-Royce Corniche III
Rolls-Royce Silver Spirit Mark II
Rolls-Royce Silver Spur Mark II
SEAT Proto T
Toyota 4500GT
Vauxhall/Opel Calibra (new front-wheel drive coupe from Vauxhall/Opel)
Zender Fact 4 Biturbo concept

1991

The following introductions were made at the 1991 show:
Audi Quattro Spyder concept
Zender Fact 4 Spider concept

1993

The following introductions were made at the 1993 show:

 Audi Space Frame (ASF) concept
Isdera Commendatore 112i

1995
The 1995 show ran from 14 to 24 September.

The following introductions were made at the 1995 show:
BMW 5 Series (E39)
Citroën Xantia Break (estate version of hatchback launched nearly three years earlier)
Lada 2110 (German introduction)
Mercedes-Benz E-Class (W210 version)
Mitsubishi Carisma (first European built Mitsubishi, produced at a Dutch Volvo factory)
Opel Corsa Eco 3
Opel Vectra (first version to use the Vectra nameplate for Vauxhall-branded models in the UK, replacing the Cavalier name)
Peugeot 406
Renault Mégane
SEAT Córdoba SX
Granvia
Volvo S40

1995 concept cars 
Audi TT Concept (entered production in 1998)
Peugeot 406 Evidence
Peugeot 406 Stadium
Toyota Prius Prototype (entered production in 1997, imported to Europe from 2000)
Zender Progetto Cinque
Lotus Elise

1997
The 1997 show ran from 11 to 21 September.

The following introductions were made at the 1997 show:
Alfa Romeo 156 (winner of the European Car of the Year award for 1998)
BMW C1
BMW Z3 Coupe
Land Rover Freelander (new entry-level model in the Land Rover section of the Rover Group)
Mazda 626 Station Wagon
Mercedes-Benz A-Class (W168)
Nissan Patrol
Opel Astra (entered production in early 1998)
Porsche 911 Carrera (996)
Rover 200 BRM
Smart Fortwo (pre-production) 
Volkswagen Golf Mk4
Volvo V70 XC

1997 concept cars
Audi Al2 Concept that led to the 1999 Audi A2
Mini Prototype (entered production in 2000 under BMW ownership)
Opel Zafira Concept (entered production just over a year later)
Peugeot 806 Runabout Concept
Proton Satria Cabriolet
Zender Escape 6

1999
The 1999 show opened on 16 September, and had nearly 1,200 exhibitors from 44 countries.

The following introductions were made at the 1999 show:
Audi A2
BMW 328 Touring (estate)
BMW M3
BMW X5 (E53) (first SUV in BMW range)
BMW Z8
Citroën Saxo (facelift)
Fiat Punto MK2
Ford Fiesta (facelift of 1995 model, itself a comprehensive facelift of the model first launched in 1989)
Honda Insight (Honda's first petrol-hybrid model)
Hyundai Accent MK2
Mercedes-Benz A-Class Advantgarde (W168)
Nissan Almera MK2 (first British-built version of the Almera)
Opel Speedster/Vauxhall VX220 (first two-seater sports car from Vauxhall/Opel, based on Lotus Elise chassis)
Peugeot 607 (new flagship saloon in Peugeot range)
Porsche 911 Turbo
Porsche Boxster S
Renault Avantime (luxury sporting coupe/MPV crossover; entered full production in 2001)
Saab 9-3 Aero
Saab 9-5 Aero
SEAT León
Škoda Fabia (Typ6Y)
Volkswagen Polo (facelift)

1999 concept cars
Bugatti 18/3 Chiron
Citroën C6 Lignage (luxury saloon which was finally launched in 2005 as the Citroën C6)
Opel Omega V8.com (never reached full production)
Volkswagen Concept D (launched in 2002 as the Volkswagen Phaeton)
Zender Thirty 7

2001
The 2001 show opened to international media on 11 September, with a series of concept and production vehicle debuts kicking off in the early morning. The following introductions were made at the 2001 show:

Alfa Romeo 156 GTA/Sportwagon GTA
Audi A4 Avant (estate)
Audi A4 Convertible
BMW 3 Series (facelift)
BMW 7 Series
Cadillac CTS
Citroën C3
Ford Fiesta
Honda Jazz
Lamborghini Murciélago
Mercedes-Benz SL-Class (R230)
Opel Combo
Renault Avantime
Saab 9-5 (facelift)
Škoda Superb
Spyker C8 Laviolette
Toyota Corolla
Volkswagen Polo
Volvo S60

2001 concept cars 
Audi Avantissimo
Citroën C-Crosser
Ford Fusion Concept
Jaguar R-Coupe
Hyundai Clix
Nissan mm.e
Nissan Crossbow
Opel Frogster
Opel Signum2 concept
Peugeot 206 SW concept
Peugeot 307 SW concept
Renault Talisman
Saab 9-X
SEAT Arosa Racer
SEAT Arosa City Cruiser
SEAT Tango
Suzuki GSX-R/4
Volvo PCC 2
Zender Straight 8
Originally, the Opel Vectra C was due to début with the Saab 9-3, but in July 2001, it was announced that delays had forced General Motors to postpone the introduction. Both cars were eventually introduced in March 2002, at the Geneva Motor Show.

2003
For the first time, the passenger car-only exhibition in Frankfurt broke the barrier of one million visitors. It featured 2,000 exhibitors from 42 countries. The following introductions were made at the 2003 show:

Alfa Romeo 166 (facelift)
Alpina B7 (E65) (production version)
Alpina Roadster S
Aston Martin DB9
Citroën C2
BMW 5 Series
BMW 6 Series
BMW X3
BMW X5 (facelift)
Daewoo Lacetti
Jaguar X-Type Estate
Kia Picanto
Land Rover Freelander (facelift)
Lexus LS430
Maserati Quattroporte
Mazda3
Mercedes-Benz SLR McLaren
Mitsubishi Outlander
Opel Astra
Opel Vectra Caravan (estate)
Porsche Carrera GT
SEAT Altea
Volkswagen Golf Mk5
Volkswagen Sharan (facelift)
Volvo S40

2003 concept cars
Citroën C-Airlounge
Ford Visos
Ford Focus Station Wagon Restyling (2003)
Lancia Fulvia Coupé Concept
Mazda Kusabi
Mitsubishi i
Nissan Dunehawk
Opel Insignia Concept
Peugeot 407 Elixir
Renault Be Bop
Saab 9-3 Sport Hatch
SEAT Altea Prototipo
Škoda Roomster
Suzuki Concept S2
Toyota CS&S
Volkswagen Concept R

2005
The exhibition focused strongly on future solutions such as hybrid, hydrogen, flex-fuel and SCR technologies for reducing NOx emissions. There were around 940,000 visitors to the 2005 show. The following introductions were made at the 2005 show:

 Audi Q7
 Audi A4 Cabriolet (facelift)
 Audi S6
 Bentley Azure
 Bufori MKIII La Joya
 Chevrolet Aveo sedan
 Daimler Super Eight
 Fiat Grande Punto
 Ford Galaxy
 Hyundai Getz (facelift)
 Honda Civic
 Jaguar XK
 Lamborghini Gallardo Spyder
 Mercedes-Benz S-Class (W221)
 Nissan Micra C+C
 Opel Vectra C (facelift)
 Opel Signum (facelift)
 Opel Astra TwinTop
  Peugeot 307 (facelift)
 Peugeot 407 Coupé
 Porsche Cayman
 Renault Clio
 Saab 9-5
 SEAT León
 Toyota Rav-4
 Toyota Yaris
 Volkswagen Eos
 Volkswagen Golf R32
 Volvo C70

2005 concept cars

 BMW Z4 Coupé
 Citroën C-SportLounge
 Ford Iosis
 Daihatsu HVS
 EDAG Roadster
 Fenomenon Stratos
 Ford SYNus
 Jeep Compass
 Jeep Patriot
 Karmann SUC
 Maybach Exelero
 Mazda Sassou
 Mercedes-Benz Vision R 63 AMG
 Mini Traveller
 Opel Antara GTC
 Peugeot 20Cup
 Peugeot Moovie
 Renault Egeus
 Smart Crosstown
 Toyota Endo
 Toyota i-unit
 Mitsubishi Concept Sportback

2007

The 2007 Frankfurt Motor Show's key theme was sustainable mobility.

The following introductions were presented at the 2007 show:

Aston Martin DBS
Aston Martin V8 Vantage N400
Aston Martin DB9 LM
Audi A4
Audi RS6
Audi A8 facelift
Bentley Continental GT Speed facelift+power upgrade
BMW 1 Series coupé
BMW 6 Series facelift
BMW M3 coupé
BMW X6 concept
Cadillac BLS Wagon
Citroën C-Airscape
Chevrolet Aveo hatchback
Dodge Journey
Ferrari 430 Scuderia
Ford Focus (facelift)
Ford Kuga
Ford Verve concept – preview of 2008 Ford Fiesta
Jaguar XF
Jonway UFO
Kia Kee concept
Kia Eco Cee'd concept
Kia Pro Cee'd
Lamborghini Reventón
Martin Motors CEO
Mazda 6
Maybach 62S
Mercedes-Benz F700 concept
Mercedes-Benz ML450 Bluetec Hybrid
Mercedes-Benz S400 Bluetec
Mini Clubman
Opel Agila
Peugeot 207 SW (estate)
Peugeot 308
Porsche 911 GT2 Model 997
Porsche Cayenne GTS
Renault Clio Estate
Renault Laguna (new generation)
Saab 9-3 Turbo-X XWD a.k.a. Black Turbo.
SEAT Tribu concept
Subaru boxer-4 turbodiesel engine.
Suzuki Splash
Škoda Fabia Combi (new generation)
Volkswagen up! concept
Wiesmann GT MF5 (Wiesmann GT with the BMW M5 E60 S85 V10 engine)

Hybrids
European automakers demonstrated a new interest in hybrid and electric vehicles at the 2007 Frankfurt Motor Show. For example, Mercedes-Benz arrived at the show with seven hybrids, including a luxury sedan concept vehicle called the F 700, a -long car that achieves a fuel economy of 44.4 miles per gallon (mpg). The research vehicle features a homogenous charge compression ignition engine, a technology that produces the high fuel economy of a diesel engine from a clean-burning gasoline engine. Mercedes has also mated its clean-diesel engine to an electric motor, creating the Bluetec hybrid. The company plans to introduce a gasoline-fueled hybrid SUV and sedan in 2009, followed by two Bluetec hybrids in 2010, one of which will achieve 51 miles per gallon of diesel fuel. In addition, the Mercedes Car Group exhibited its smart car in three new incarnations: an electric-only vehicle and both diesel and gasoline versions with "micro hybrid drive", a belt-driven starter and alternator that allows the engine to shut off at stops. See the DaimlerChrysler press releases about the auto show and the F700.

Opel, a subsidiary of General Motors, unveiled the Flextreme, a plug-in hybrid that can travel  on its lithium-ion battery before a small diesel engine starts charging the battery.  Opel also unveiled the Corsa Hybrid, a coupe that combines a belt-driven starter and alternator with a lithium-ion battery.

Volvo Cars, a division of Ford Motor Company, exhibited a plug-in hybrid with motors in each of the wheels.

The Citroën C-Cactus regular diesel-electric hybrid vehicle debuted at the 2007 Frankfurt Motor Show.

2009

The theme of the 2009 Frankfurt Motor Show can best be summed up in one word: "electrification." Virtually every manufacturer has unveiled a vehicle using the latest battery technology.

The following introductions were presented at the 2009 show:

Production cars

Alfa Romeo MiTo Quadrifoglio Verde
Aston Martin Rapide
2010 Audi A5 Sportback
2010 Audi R8 Spyder
2010 Bentley Mulsanne
2010 BMW 5 Series Gran Turismo
2010 BMW 740d
2010 BMW X1
2010 BMW ActiveHybrid X6
2010 BMW ActiveHybrid 7
Citroën C3
Citroën DS3
2010 Dodge Caliber
2010 Ferrari 458 Italia
 Fiat 500 Abarth by Ferrari
Fiat Punto Evo
 Fiat Qubo Treking
2011 Ford C-Max
2011 Ford Grand C-Max
 G-Wix electric cars
2010 Honda CR-V
2010 Hyundai i10 Electric
2010 Hyundai ix35
 Hyundai Santa Fe
2010 Jaguar XJ
2010 Koenigsegg CCXR Trevita
2010 Kia Cee'd (facelift)
2010 Kia Venga
2010 Kia Sorento
 Kia Forte LPI Hybrid (European introduction)
 Kia cee'd Hybrid
 Kia Sorento Hybrid
 Kia Venga MPV
2010 Lamborghini Reventón Roadster
 Lexus IS-F sport package
 Lotus Elise Club Racer
 Lotus Evora Club Racer
 2011 Maserati GranCabrio
 Mazda CX-7
2010 Mercedes-Benz E-Class Estate
2010 Mercedes-Benz SLS AMG
2010 Opel Astra
2010 Peugeot RCZ
2010 Peugeot 5008
2011 Peugeot iOn
2010 Porsche 911 Sport Classic & Turbo
2010 Porsche 911 GT3 Cup & RS
2010 Porsche Panamera (European introduction)
 Range Rover Sport
2010 REVA NXR and NXG
Rolls-Royce Ghost
2010 Saab 9-5
 SEAT León Cupra R
 Škoda Superb Estate
2010 Subaru Legacy (European introduction)
2010 Subaru Outback (European introduction)
2010 Toyota Land Cruiser
2010 Volkswagen California
2010 Volkswagen Caravelle
2010 Volkswagen Golf BlueMotion
2010 Volkswagen Passat BlueMotion
2010 Volkswagen Polo 3dr and GTI
2010 Volkswagen Polo BlueMotion
2010 Volkswagen Golf R
2010 Volkswagen Transporter
2011 Volvo C30
2011 Volvo C70
2010 Volvo XC60 R-Design

2009 concept cars

 Audi e-Tron
BMW Vision Efficient Dynamics
Bugatti 16C Galibier (previous called Bugatti Bordeaux)
Citroën Revolte
Hyundai ix Metro
 Lexus LF-Ch
Mazda MX-5 Superlight
 Mercedes-Benz Vision S 500 Plug-in Hybrid
Mini Coupé and Roadster
 Peugeot BB1
 Renault Fluence Z.E.
 Renault Kangoo Z.E.
 Renault Twizy Z.E.
 Renault Zoe Z.E.
 SEAT Ibz concept
Tesla Model S
 Trabant nT
Toyota Auris HSD Full Hybrid Concept
Toyota iQ Sport
Toyota Prius Plug-In Hybrid Concept
 Volkswagen E-Up
 Volkswagen L1

2011

The 2011 show was held from 13 to 25 September. The 64th edition of the show included 1,012 exhibitors from 32 countries and was attended by more than 928,000 visitors from 105 countries, 36% of them being trade visitors, among those 80% from the automotive industry, plus more than 12'000 accredited journalists from 98 countries. 183 world premieres were unveiled.

Production cars

2012 Abarth 695 Competizione
2012 Alfa Romeo MiTo 0.9 TwinAir 85
2011 Alpina B6 Biturbo cabriolet
2012 Aston Martin DBS Carbon Edition
2012 Audi A5/S5 (facelift)
2012 Audi S6
2012 Audi S7
2012 Audi S8
2012 Audi R8 GT Spyder
2012 Bentley Continental GTC
2012 BMW 1
2012 BMW M5
2012 Chevrolet Camaro (European version)
2012 Chevrolet Malibu (European version)
2012 Citroën DS5
2012 Ferrari 458 Spider
2012 Fiat Panda
2012 Ford Fiesta ECOnetic
2012 Ford Focus ST (production version)
2011 Honda Civic (European version)
2012 Hyundai i30
2012 Jaguar XF
2012 Jeep Wrangler 3.6 V6
Kia K9
2012 Kia Rio 3-door
2012 Lamborghini Gallardo LP570-4
2012 Lancia Flavia Cabrio
2012 Lancia Thema
2012 Lancia Voyager
2013 Lexus GS 350
2013 Lotus Exige S
2012 Mazda CX-5
2012 Mercedes-Benz B-Class
Mia electric
Mini Coupé
2012 Opel/Vauxhall Astra GTC
2012 Opel/Vauxhall Combo
2012 Opel/Vauxhall Zafira Tourer
2012 Peugeot 508 RXH Diesel Hybrid
2012 Porsche 911 Carrera
2011 Radical Sportscars SR3 SL
2012 Renault Koleos (facelift)
2012 Renault Twingo (facelift)
2012 SEAT Exeo (facelift)
2012 smart fortwo electric
2012 Subaru XV
2012 Suzuki Swift Sport
2012 Toyota Avensis (facelift)
2012 Toyota Prius+ (European version)
2012 Toyota Yaris
2012 Volkswagen up!
Yo-Mobil

2011 concept cars

Alfa Romeo 4C
Audi A2 Concept
Audi Urban Concept
Audi Urban Spyder Concept
BMW i3
BMW i8
Chevrolet Miray
Citroën Tubik
Eterniti Motors Hemera
Fisker Surf
Ford Evos
Ford Fiesta ST Concept
Infiniti FX Sebastian Vettel Concept
Jaguar C-X16
Kia GT Concept
Land Rover DC100
Maserati Kubang
Mercedes-Benz B-Class E-CELL Plus Concept
Mercedes-Benz F125
Mitsubishi PX-MiEV
Opel RAK e
Peugeot HX1
Renault Frendzy Electric Concept
Rimac Concept One Electric Supercar
SEAT IBL
Skoda Mission L
Smart forvision
SsangYong XUV-1
Volkswagen Beetle R Concept
Volkswagen Buggy up!
Volkswagen Nils
Volvo Concept You

2013

The 2013 show took place from 10 to 22 September.

Nissan introduced a "smart watch" that measures the user's heart rate, temperature and other biometrics. It is also able to keep a watch on car data like fuel efficiency and average speed. It was developed by Nissan's Nismo laboratory. They currently capture live biometric and telematics data from Nissan racing cars and their drivers.

Production cars

 Abarth 595 50 Anniversario
 Abarth 695 Tributo Maserati
 2014 Alfa Romeo Giulietta
 Alfa Romeo MiTo
 Aston Martin Vanquish Volante
 Audi A8/S8
 Audi A3/S3 Cabriolet
 Audi A3 Ultra
 Bentley Continental GT V8 S
 BMW 5 Series
 BMW X5 (F15)
 BMW i3
 BMW i8
 BMW 4 Coupé
 Bugatti Veyron Grand Sport Vitesse Jean Bugatti
 Caterham Seven 165
 2014 Chevrolet Cruze
 Chevrolet Camaro
 Citroën Grand C4 Picasso
 Citroën DS3 Cabrio Racing
 Dacia Duster
 Ferrari 458 Speciale
 Fiat Panda 4x4 Antartica
 Fiat 500C GQ
 Ford Focus EcoBoost
 Honda Civic Tourer
 Hyundai i10
 Jaguar XJ/XJR
 Jeep Wrangler Polar
 Kia Optima (facelift)
 Kia Soul (European introduction)
 Lamborghini Gallardo LP570-4 Squadra Corse
 Lancia Voyager S
 2014 Lancia Delta
 Land Rover Discovery
 Lexus GS 300h
 Maserati Ghibli
 2014 Mazda3
 Mercedes-Benz S63 AMG (W222)
 Mercedes-Benz S 500 Plug-in Hybrid
 Mercedes-Benz GLA-Class
 Nissan Micra (European facelift)
2014 Nissan X-Trail
 Opel Adam White & Black Link
2014 Opel Insignia facelift & Country Tourer
 Peugeot 308
 Peugeot 3008 (facelift)
 Peugeot RCZ R
 Porsche 918 Spyder
 Porsche 911 Turbo/Turbo S
 Renault Koleos (facelift)
 Renault Latitude
 Renault Mégane (facelift)
 SEAT Leon ST
 Škoda Octavia vRS
 Škoda Rapid Spaceback
 2014 Škoda Yeti facelift
 Suzuki Swift Sport
 Volkswagen e-Up!
 Seat Leon ST
 Volkswagen e-Golf
 Volkswagen Golf R

2013 concept cars

 Audi Nanuk Quattro
 Audi Sport Quattro
 Cadillac Elmiraj
 Citroën Cactus Concept
 Ford S-Max
 Ford Mondeo Vignale Concept
 Infiniti Q30
 Jaguar C-X17
 Kia Niro
 Lexus LF-NX
 Mercedes-Benz S-Class Coupé
 Mini Vision Concept
 Opel Monza Concept
 Peugeot 308 R Concept
 Smart fourjoy
 Renault Initiale Paris
 Subaru WRX Concept
 Volkswagen Golf Sportsvan
 Volvo Concept Coupé

2015

The 2015 show took place from 17 to 27 September.

Production cars

 Alfa Romeo Giulia Quadrifoglio
 Audi A4
 Audi S4
 Bentley Bentayga
 BMW 3 Series (Facelift)
 BMW 7 Series
 BMW X1 (F48)
 BMW M6 GT3
 BMW M6 Competition Package
 DS 4 (Facelift)
 DS 4 Crossback
 Ferrari 488 Spider
 Fiat 500 (Facelift)
 Ford Ecosport (Facelift)
 Ford Edge (International specs)
 Ford Kuga (Facelift)
 Hyundai i20 WRC
 Infiniti Q30
 Jaguar F-Pace
 Kia Sportage
 Kia cee'd (Facelift)
 Lamborghini Aventador LP 750-4 SuperVeloce Roadster
 Lamborghini Huracán LP 610-4 Spyder
 Mercedes-Benz C-Class Coupe
 Mercedes C63/C63 S AMG Coupe
 Mercedes-Benz C63 AMG Coupe Edition 1
 Mercedes-AMG C-Coupé DTM (W205)
 Mercedes-Benz S-Class Convertible
 Mini Clubman
 Nissan NP300 Navara
 Opel Astra
 Porsche 991 (Facelift)
 Renault Mégane
 Renault Talisman
 Rolls-Royce Dawn
 SEAT Ibiza Cupra (Facelift)
 SEAT Leon Cupra 290
 Smart Fortwo Cabriolet
 Suzuki Baleno
 Toyota Prius
 Volkswagen Golf GTI Clubsport
 Volkswagen Tiguan

2015 concept cars

 Audi e-tron Quattro concept
 Bugatti Vision Gran Turismo
 Citroën Cactus M
 Honda Project 2&4
 Hyundai N 2025 Vision Gran Turismo
 Mazda Koeru
 Mercedes-Benz Concept IAA
 Nissan Gripz
 Peugeot Fractal
 Porsche Mission E
 SsangYong XAV-Adventure
 SEAT Leon Sport Cross
 Toyota C-HR
 Volkswagen Golf GTE Sport

2017
The 2017 show took place from 14 to 24 September, with press days on the 12th and 13th.

Production cars

 Alpina D5 S
 Audi RS4 Avant
 Audi A8
 Bentley Continental GT
 BMW 6 Series GT
 BMW X3
 BMW i3 (facelift)
 BMW M5
 Brabus-Mercedes E63 AMG S
 Citroën C3 Aircross
 Dacia Duster
 Ferrari Portofino
 Ford EcoSport (facelift) (European debut)
 Ford Mustang (facelift) (European debut)
 Honda Jazz (facelift)
 Honda CR-V (European debut)
 Hyundai i30 Fastback and N variants
 Hyundai Kona
 Jaguar E-Pace
 Kia Picanto X-Line
 Kia Sorento (facelift)
 Kia Stonic
 Lamborghini Aventador S Roadster
 Land Rover Discovery SVX
 Lexus CT200h (second facelift)
 Lexus NX (facelift)
 Mercedes-Benz GLC-Class F-Cell
 Mercedes-Benz S-Class Coupe and Cabriolet (facelifts)
 Mercedes-Benz X-Class
 Opel Grandland X
 Opel Insignia GSi and Country Tourer variants
 Porsche 911 GT2 RS
 Porsche 911 GT3 Touring Package
 Porsche Cayenne
 Renaultsport Mégane
 Rolls-Royce Phantom VIII
 SEAT Arona
 SEAT Leon Cupra R
 Škoda Karoq
 Subaru Impreza (European debut)
 Suzuki Swift Sport
 Volkswagen Polo MK6
 Volkswagen T-Roc

2017 concept cars

 Aspark Owl
 Audi AI:CON
 Audi Elaine
 BMW i Vision Dynamics Concept
 BMW Concept X7 iPerformance
 Borgward Isabella Concept
 Honda Urban EV Concept
Kia Proceed concept
 Mercedes EQ A concept
 Mercedes-AMG Project One
 Mini Electric Concept
 Mini John Cooper Works GP Concept
 Smart Vision EQ Fortwo
 Volkswagen I.D. Crozz

2019
The 2019 show took place from 12 to 22 September, with press days on the 10th and 11th.

Production cars

 Alpina B3 Touring
 Audi A1 Citycarver
 Audi A4 (facelift)
 Audi A5 (facelift)
 Audi A6 Allroad Quattro
 Audi RS6 Avant
 Audi RS7 Sportback
 Audi S5 (facelift)
 Audi S6
 Audi S8
 Audi Q3 Sportback
 Audi Q7 (facelift)
 Audi SQ8 TDI
 Audi e-tron FE06 Racecar
 BMW 1 Series
 BMW 3 Series Touring
 BMW 8 Series Gran Coupé
 BMW M8 Competition Coupé
 BMW X1
 BMW X5 Protection VR6
 BMW X6
 BMW i8 Ultimate Sophisto Edition
 Brabus Mercedes-AMG A35
 Brabus G V12 900
 Brabus Ultimate E
 Byton M-Byte
 Ford Explorer Plug-in Hybrid
 Ford Kuga Plug-in Hybrid
 Ford Puma
 Honda e
 Hyundai i10
 Hyundai i30 N Project C
 Hyundai Veloster N ETCR
 Lamborghini Sián
 Land Rover Defender
 Mercedes-AMG A45 S 4MATIC+
 Mercedes-AMG CLA35 Shooting Brake
 Mercedes-AMG CLA45 S 4MATIC+
 Mercedes-AMG GLB35 4MATIC
 Mercedes-AMG GLE53 4MATIC Coupé
 Mercedes-Benz A250e
 Mercedes-Benz B250e
 Mercedes-Benz GLB
 Mercedes-Benz GLC 350e
 Mercedes-Benz GLE 350de
 Mercedes-Benz GLE Coupé
 Mercedes-Benz GLS
 Mercedes-Benz EQV
 Mini Cooper S E
 Opel Astra (facelift)
 Opel Corsa
 Opel Grandland X HYBRID4
 Porsche 718 Spyder
 Porsche 718 Cayman GT4
 Porsche 911 Carrera 4
 Porsche Cayenne Coupé
 Porsche Macan Turbo (facelift)
 Porsche Taycan
 Porsche 99X Electric Formula E Racecar
 Ramsmobile Protos RM-X2D Devil's Touch
 Renault Captur
 SEAT Tarraco FR PHEV
 Škoda Citigo iV
 Škoda Kodiaq vRS
 Škoda Kamiq Monte Carlo
 Škoda Scala Monte Carlo
 Škoda Superb (facelift)
 Škoda Superb iV
 Smart EQ ForTwo
 Smart EQ ForFour
 Trasco-Bremen XC90 Protection VR8 by Volvo
 Volkswagen e-Up!
 Volkswagen ID.3 
 Volkswagen T-Roc Cabriolet

2019 concept cars

 Audi AI:CON Concept
 Audi AI:ME Concept
 Audi AI:RACE Concept
 Audi AI:TRAIL Quattro Concept
 BMW Concept 4
 BMW X5 i Hydrogen NEXT
 BMW Vision M Next Concept
 Cupra Tavascan Concept
 FAW Hongqi S9
 FAW Hongqi E115
 Hyundai 45 EV Concept 
 Hyundai H-Space
 Mercedes-Benz Experimental Safety Vehicle (ESF) 2019
 Mercedes-Benz Vision EQS
 Mercedes-Benz Vision EQ Silver Arrow Concept
 Opel Corsa-e Rally

2021 

The 2021 show took place from 7 to 12 September, with a press day on the 6th. Exhibitions are divided over seven locations around central Munich.

Production cars

 ACM City One
 Audi RS3
 BMW 2 Series Coupé 
 BMW M240i
 BMW 4 Series Gran Coupé
 BMW i4
 BMW X3 (facelift)
 BMW X4 (facelift)
 BMW iX3 (facelift)
 Cupra Born
 Dacia Jogger
 Dacia Duster (facelift)
 GWM Ora Cat
 GWM Wey Coffee 01
 Hyundai Ioniq 5 Robotaxi
 Kia Sportage
 Mercedes-AMG GT 4-Door Coupé 63 S E Performance
 Mercedes-AMG EQS 53
 Mercedes-Benz C-Class All-Terrain
 Mercedes-Benz EQE
 Microlino
 Porsche 911 Carrera GTS
 Porsche 911 GT3 Touring Package
 Porsche Taycan Cross Turismo
 Renault Mégane E-Tech
 Volkswagen ID.5 Coupe
 Volkswagen Multivan

2021 concept cars 

 Audi Grand Sphere
 Audi Skysphere
 Audi Urban Sphere
 BMW i Hydrogen Next
 BMW I Vision Circular
 Cupra UrbanRebel
 Mercedes-Benz EQG
 Mercedes-Benz EQT
 Mercedes-Maybach EQS
 Porsche Mission R
 Renault 5 E-Tech
 Smart #1
 Volkswagen ID. Life

2022 

The 2022 show took place in Hanover from 20 to 25 September.

Production cars
 Ford E-Transit Custom
 Iveco eDaily
 MAN eTGE
 MAN eTruck
 Maxus T90EV
 Maxus Mifa 9
 Renault Trafic E-Tech
 Volkswagen Amarok

Concept cars
 Ford Pro Electric SuperVan
 Iveco Daily 4x4 Tigrotto
 Renault Hippie Caviar Motel

Attendance

Passenger vehicles (since 2021: IAA MOBILITY)

Commercial vehicles (since 2022: IAA TRANSPORTATION)

References

External links

 Official homepage
 590 Pictures from 2007 Frankfurt Motor Show KFZ-KULTUR.de

Auto shows in Germany
Trade fairs in Germany
Autumn events in Germany
Automotive industry in Germany